Warren Ingersoll (March 22, 1908 – September 6, 1995) was an American field hockey player. He competed in the men's tournament at the 1932 Summer Olympics, winning the bronze medal.

References

External links
 

1908 births
1995 deaths
American male field hockey players
Field hockey players at the 1932 Summer Olympics
Field hockey players from Philadelphia
Olympic bronze medalists for the United States in field hockey
Medalists at the 1932 Summer Olympics